Tiruvallur is a Grade I municipality and a fast developing city in the Indian state of Tamil Nadu. It is the administrative headquarters of Tiruvallur district.
The city is known for the Veera Raghavar temple, one of the 108 sacred shrines of Vaishnavites. The tank festival is held at a pond near this temple. A Shiva temple near this shrine which is popular among the locals.

The neighborhood is served by Tiruvallur railway station of the Chennai Suburban Railway Network. As of 2011, the city had a population of 56,074. It is one of the fast-developing suburbs of Chennai.

Etymology
The name Tiruvallur is supposedly derived from the Tamil sentence tiru evvull? – Tiru meaning god, a common prefix in South India for temple towns, and evvull meaning where do I sleep?. Tiruvallur is said to mean a place or town where the god Veera Raghavar asked a saint for a place to sleep for a night.

In one telling of the story, a rishi (sage) named Saalihothirar came down from Badrinath, now in Uttaranchal State, and settled in this place in order to reach Paramapadam (the abode of Lord Mahavisnu). He bathed in Hiruthaapanasana Theertham and started the vow of silence (mouna viratham) for one year. Daily he collected rice and after a year of fasting, he purified and cooked the rice, offering some to God (Naivedhyam) and duly kept the rest for himself. He waited for a guest, probably a muni or rishi, so that he could invite him to eat and end his fasting.
At that time the God Narayana, intending to test the devotion of the rishi, came there as an old muni looking very hungry and thirsty. On seeing him, Saalihothirar greeted him and offered a portion of the rice he had kept for himself, but Narayana wanted the entire quantity of rice. Saalihothirar was very happy to give all of the food to his guest, starving himself. After eating the food, Narayana asked, "where do I sleep?" (Tamil: Ev-uL-uRangalAm). Saalihothirar asked him to sleep in his own hut.

History
In the far past, this region was under a chain of regimes commencing from the Pallavas during the 7th century. In 1687, the Golkonda rulers were defeated and the region came under the Moghul emperors of Delhi. The towns and villages of this region were the scene of Carnatic wars. Battles are said to have been fought in this region during the struggle for supremacy between the English and French. The town of Pulicat was the earliest Dutch possession in India, founded in 1609; it was ceded to the British in 1825. British rule continued until India's independence in 1947.

Demographics

According to the 2011, Thiruvallur had a population of 56,074 with a sex-ratio of 999 females for every 1,000 males, above the national average of 929. Scheduled Castes and Scheduled Tribes accounted for 19% and 0.6% of the population, respectively. The literacy rate of the city was 79.77%, compared to the national average of 72.99%. As per the religious census of 2011, Thiruvallur had 86.45% Hindus, 5.88% Muslims, 6.17% Christians, 0.02% Sikhs, 0.02% Buddhists, 0.35% Jains, 1.12% following other religions and 0.0% following no religion or with no religious preference.

Politics

Tiruvallur assembly constituency is part of Tiruvallur (Lok Sabha constituency). Tiruvallur Lok Sabha seat is represented by K. Jayakumar of INC (DMK, part of the UPA Alliance)

Thiruvallur (state assembly constituency) is represented in the TN Assembly by V.G. Rajendran of Dravida Munnetra Kazhagam (DMK)

Tiruvallur Municipality Chairman post is vacant as of 2018.

Landmarks

 Veera Raghavar temple – a place of worship for Lord Vishnu as Veera Raghavar
 Hanuman Temple at Kakkalur –  from Tiruvallur, this village temple has a  green monolithic granite murti of Lord Viswaroopa Panchamukha Hanuman ( Panchamukhi Hanuman).
 Temple for Sri Viswaroopa Panchamukha Hanuman – at Periakuppam, Thiruvallur, this  statue is made of a single piece of green granite which was brought from Hassan in Karnataka.

Economy 
The city attained district-headquarters status in 1997. Tiruvallur houses many industries including manufacturing facilities of Hindustan Motors, Caterpillar earth-moving equipment, Hanil Lear, Delphi TVS, India Japan Lighting, Kingfisher's brewery division, Style SPA furniture, TI India, TCL, and Mitsubishi. Tiruvallur is also home to the Pandurangan family of pen makers operating under the brand name Ranga.

Tiruvallur is surrounded by industrial hubs in and around Chennai, such as Ambattur Industrial Estate and Sriperumbudur Industrial Estate, which connect to Tiruvallur by suburban train and buses.

Developments
The Chennai Metropolitan Development Authority (CMDA) drafted a master plan to develop Tiruvallur as a satellite township around the city. This development is encouraged by developing infrastructure, such as affordable housing, in order to relieve congestion in the metropolis and provide a better standard of living.

The state government was to decide on the expansion of the Chennai Metropolitan Area (CMA) before the end of fiscal year . Minister for Housing and Urban Development R Vaithilingam told the State Assembly on 25 August 2011 that, in view of the fast-paced development taking place in areas beyond the present metropolitan-area jurisdiction, it had become necessary to review the Chennai Metropolitan Planning Area of 1973–74.

Industries
Tiruvallur is a fast-developing district. Agriculture is the mainstay of the economy. The major crops cultivated are paddy, sugarcane and groundnut, with smaller crops of millets (cumbu, ragi, tinai, etc.), pulses (red gram, black gram, green gram, etc.), gingelly and chillies. Vegetables, flowers and fruits (mango, banana, etc.) are also grown. Three cropping seasons are being followed in the district for paddy, viz, Sornavari (April–August), Samba (July–Jan) and Navarai (December–March).

Peripheral areas of the district have industrial units, with industry and commerce gaining a prominent position.

Stray cattle
In Tiruvallur, multiple vehicle accidents have occurred due to the stray cattle. Most of the accidents related to stray cattle on the roads occurred at night, when it is harder to see the animal on roads with insufficient lights. The residents of Tiruvallur district who allow their cattle to freely wander on the roads have been warned by the police. Imprisonment of up to three years and fine up to ₹5,000 are applicable according to the provisions of the Tamil Nadu Animals and Birds in Urban Areas (Control and Regulation) Act, 1997. Police have also threatened actions according to the Indian Penal Code and Prevention of Cruelty to Animals Act, in addition the stray cattle would be sent to cow sheds operated by the government. Yet these measures have not reduced the practice of cattle owners releasing their cattle. The authorities of Tiruvallur district have also set up call center to report incidents of stray cattle.

Transport
Tiruvallur is situated on the Chennai–Tirupati trunk road. Other major roads connecting Chennai and Tiruvallur include a route through Kakalur, Putlur, Sevapet, Veppampattu, Tiruninravur, Avadi, Tirumullaivayil, Ambattur and Villivakkam, and another route through Poonamallee and Koyambedu.

Tiruvallur lies on the Chennai–Bangalore broad gauge railway line and is a stop for some of the WestNorth trains. There are two suburban railway lines: the West line from Chennai Central to Arakkonam and the WestNorth line from Chennai Central to Tiruttani. These two lines have many frequent suburban trains.

The Metropolitan Transport Corporation (MTC) runs an extensive city bus system, with service from Tiruvallur to most of the important places in Chennai and its metropolitan area.

Education
There are a large number of educational institutions in Tiruvallur. Many professional institutions, particularly the veterinary university, add to education in this district. Tiruvallur has many higher secondary schools including private and government schools. There are a few engineering, medical, and arts and science colleges around Tiruvallur.

Colleges

Schools

References

External links 

 

Cities and towns in Tiruvallur district
Tiruvallur
Satellite City of Chennai